In probability, and statistics, a multivariate random variable or random vector is a list or vector of mathematical variables each of whose value is unknown, either because the value has not yet occurred or because there is imperfect knowledge of its value.  The individual variables in a random vector are grouped together because they are all part of a single mathematical system — often they represent different properties of an individual statistical unit. For example, while a given person has a specific age, height and weight, the representation of these features of an unspecified person from within a group would be a random vector. Normally each element of a random vector is a real number. 

Random vectors are often used as the underlying implementation of various types of aggregate random variables, e.g. a random matrix, random tree, random sequence, stochastic process, etc.

Probability distribution

This measure is also known as the joint probability distribution, the joint distribution, or the multivariate distribution of the random vector.

The distributions of each of the component random variables  are called marginal distributions. The conditional probability distribution of  given  is the probability distribution of  when  is known to be a particular value.

The cumulative distribution function  of a random vector  is defined as

where .

Operations on random vectors
Random vectors can be subjected to the same kinds of algebraic operations as can non-random vectors: addition, subtraction, multiplication by a scalar, and the taking of inner products.

Affine transformations
Similarly, a new random vector  can be defined by applying an affine transformation  to a random vector :

.

Invertible mappings
More generally we can study invertible mappings of random vectors.

Assume that the real random vector  has a probability density function  and satisfies . Then the random vector  is of probability density

Expected value
The expected value or mean of a random vector  is a fixed vector  whose elements are the expected values of the respective random variables.

Covariance and cross-covariance

Definitions
The covariance matrix (also called second central moment or variance-covariance matrix) of an  random vector is an  matrix whose (i,j)th element is the covariance between the i th and the j th random variables.

where again the matrix expectation is taken element-by-element in the matrix.

Properties
The covariance matrix is a symmetric matrix, i.e.
.

The covariance matrix is a positive semidefinite matrix, i.e.
.

The cross-covariance matrix  is simply the transpose of the matrix , i.e.
.

Uncorrelatedness
.

They are uncorrelated if and only if their cross-covariance matrix  is zero.

Correlation and cross-correlation

Definitions
The correlation matrix (also called second moment) of an  random vector is an  matrix whose (i,j)th element is the correlation between the i th and the j th random variables.

Properties
The correlation matrix is related to the covariance matrix by
.
Similarly for the cross-correlation matrix and the cross-covariance matrix:

Orthogonality
.

Independence

.

Characteristic function
The characteristic function of a random vector  with  components is a function  that maps every vector  to a complex number. It is defined by

.

Further properties

Expectation of a quadratic form
One can take the expectation of a quadratic form in the random vector  as follows:

Since the quadratic form is a scalar, so is its expectation.

Hence

which leaves us to show that

This is true based on the fact that one can cyclically permute matrices when taking a trace without changing the end result.

We see that

And since

is a scalar, then

trivially. Using the permutation we get:

and by plugging this into the original formula we get:

Expectation of the product of two different quadratic forms
One can take the expectation of the product of two different quadratic forms in a zero-mean Gaussian random vector  as follows:

Again, since both quadratic forms are scalars and hence their product is a scalar, the expectation of their product is also a scalar.

Applications

Portfolio theory
In portfolio theory in finance, an objective often is to choose a portfolio of risky assets such that the distribution of the random portfolio return has desirable properties. For example, one might want to choose the portfolio return having the lowest variance for a given expected value. Here the random vector is the vector  of random returns on the individual assets, and the portfolio return p (a random scalar) is the inner product of the vector of random returns with a vector w of portfolio weights — the fractions of the portfolio placed in the respective assets.

Regression theory
In linear regression theory, we have data on n observations on a dependent variable y and n observations on each of k independent variables xj. The observations on the dependent variable are stacked into a column vector y; the observations on each independent variable are also stacked into column vectors, and these latter column vectors are combined into a design matrix  X (not denoting a random vector in this context) of observations on the independent variables.  Then the following regression equation is postulated as a description of the process that generated the data:

where β is a postulated fixed but unknown vector of k response coefficients, and e is an unknown random vector reflecting random influences on the dependent variable.  By some chosen technique such as ordinary least squares, a vector  is chosen as an estimate of β, and the estimate of the vector e, denoted , is computed as

Vector time series

The evolution of a k×1 random vector  through time can be modelled as a vector autoregression (VAR) as follows:

References

Further reading

Multivariate statistics
Algebra of random variables

de:Zufallsvariable#Mehrdimensionale Zufallsvariable
pl:Zmienna losowa#Uogólnienia